Pleurofusia fluctuosa is an extinct species of sea snail, a marine gastropod mollusk in the family Drilliidae.

Distribution
This extinct marine species was found in Eocene strata of Louisiana and Mississippi, USA; age range: 40.4 to 37.2 Ma.

References

fluctuosa
Gastropods described in 1937